Castor and Pollux may refer to:

Castor and Pollux, in Greek and Roman mythology, the twin sons of Lēda and Zeus/Tyndareus, who were transformed into the constellation Gemini
 Castor and Pollux, two stars in the constellation Gemini
Castor and Pollux (elephants), two elephants kept at the zoo of the Jardin d'Acclimatation or Jardin des Plantes in Paris
Castor and Pollux (Prado), an ancient Roman sculptural group
Castor et Pollux, an opera by Jean-Philippe Rameau
Castor and Pollux River, in Nunavut, Canada
Castor and Pollux, a composition by Harry Partch
Temple of Castor and Pollux, in the Roman Forum, Rome
Castor (Zwillinge) and Pollux (Zwillinge), twin mountain peaks in the Pennine Alps on the Italian/Swiss border
Castor and Pollux, two summits in Yellowstone National Park in Wyoming, USA
Castor and Pollux (269 tons) was a British ship built at Teignmouth in 1790
Castor and Pollux Troy, characters in the 1997 film Face/Off

See also
Castor (disambiguation)
Pollux (disambiguation)